This is a list of earthquakes in 1953. Only magnitude 6.0 or greater earthquakes appear on the list. Lower magnitude events are included if they have caused death, injury or damage. Events which occurred in remote areas will be excluded from the list as they wouldn't have generated significant media interest. All dates are listed according to UTC time. This was a fairly active year. There were no great quakes above magnitude 8.0+ as experienced in previous years. Magnitude 7.0+ quakes numbered 11 in all. Japan led the way in magnitude terms. Other large quakes struck Chile, New Zealand, Papua New Guinea and Turkey. The quakes with the most human casualties were in Turkey, Iran and Greece with the vast majority of the death toll coming from these events.

Overall

By death toll 

 Note: At least 10 casualties

By magnitude 

 Note: At least 7.0 magnitude

Notable events

January

February

March

April

May

June

July

August

September

October

November

December

References

1953
 
1953